The National Democratic Front was a coalition of left-wing Mexican political parties created to compete in the 1988 presidential elections, being the immediate predecessor of the Party of the Democratic Revolution (PRD). It was result of an agglutination of small political left and center-left forces with dissident members from the Institutional Revolutionary Party (PRI). Their candidate for the presidential election was Cuauhtémoc Cárdenas.

History

Background 
The National Democratic Front had its origins in the PRI, where the Democratic Current - founded in 1986 and led by Cuauhtémoc Cárdenas, Porfirio Muñoz Ledo, César Buenrostro, Ifigenia Martínez, among others - tried to democratize the internal selection of the PRI's presidential candidate, while also protesting against the economic policies of then-president Miguel de la Madrid. When in October 1987 Carlos Salinas de Gortari was nominated the official PRI candidate De la Madrid, the members of the Democratic Current broke from the PRI, looking for a party to support Cárdenas' presidential candidacy.

On 14 October 1987, Cárdenas was nominated by the Authentic Party of the Mexican Revolution (PARM). Shortly after, the Party of the Cardenist Front of National Reconstruction (PFCRN), the Social Democratic Party, the Popular Socialist Party (PPS), the Liberal Party and the Green Party (the predecessor the Ecologist Green Party of Mexico), all of them small political forces, endorsed him as well. These parties would only nominate Cárdenas as their candidate, but they would not contribute to the later formation of the Party of the Democratic Revolution.

Formation 
Cárdenas and Muñoz Ledo made a pact in 1988 with the Mexican left in which the Mexican Socialist Party (whose candidate was Heberto Castillo) endorsed Cárdenas' candidacy as well. It also allied itself with many social organizations, like the Coalition of Workers, Peasants, and Students of the Isthmus (COCEI) (that had gained the local elections in Juchitán de Zaragoza), the Independent Central of Agricultural Workers and Peasants (CIOAC), the Assembly of Districts of the City of Mexico (created after 1985 earthquakes), the Union of Popular Colonies and the Emiliano Zapata Revolutionary Union among others. This agglomerate of civil parties and organizations would be, along with the Democratic Current of the PRI, the base of the future PRD.

Aftermath 
The official winner of the 6 July 1988 presidential election Carlos Salinas de Gortari, in what has been widely considered a fraudulent election. Cárdenas, like the rest of the opposition candidates, protested against the fraud, and he claimed victory for himself. Cárdenas and the other leaders of the FDN would held multitudinous protests against the fraud, but they were unable to prevent Salinas de Gortari from taking office.

After the elections, many of the parties and social organizations that had formed the National Democratic Front decided to join forces to create a new party, the Party of the Democratic Revolution (PRD), that would be formally founded on 5 May 1989, with Cuauhtémoc Cárdenas as its president.

References 

Defunct left-wing political party alliances
Defunct political party alliances in Mexico
Institutional Revolutionary Party breakaway groups
Modern Mexico
Party of the Democratic Revolution
Social democratic parties in Mexico
Social democratic parties
Socialist parties in Mexico
Mexico